Doris Ann Scharfenberg (February 24, 1917 – January 4, 2009) was a US television producer who was one of the first women TV executives at NBC. She won an Emmy award in 1973.

References 

1917 births
2009 deaths
Emmy Award winners
American women television producers
NBC executives
21st-century American women